Gak or GAK may refer to:

People
 Huh Gak (born 1984), South Korean singer
 Kim Gak (1536–1610), Korean military officer and poet
 Gak Jonze (born 1982), English rapper

Places
 Ağdam, Khojavend (also Gak), a village in the Khojavend Rayon of Azerbaijan
 Gak, South Sudan, a boma in Kolnyang payam, Bor South County, Jonglei State

Other uses
 GAK (EP), a 1994 recording by Richard D. James
 GAK (protein), a serine/threonine kinase that in humans is encoded by the GAK gene
 Gamkonora language (ISO 639-3 code: gak), a North Halmahera language of Indonesia
 Grazer AK, an Austrian sports club
 Gak, a compound developed by Nickelodeon and Mattel.